Ornithogalum gabrielianiae, commonly known as the Gabrielyan's starflowers, is a flowering plant in the family Asparagaceae. It is endemic to Armenia. 

It is classified as critically endangered by the International Union for Conservation of Nature.

Distribution 
It is found in Armenia.

Taxonomy 
It was described by Natalija Agapova, in Willdenowia 27: 199. in 1997.

References

External links 

gabrielianiae
Critically endangered flora of Asia